Aftenland is an album by Norwegian jazz composer and saxophonist Jan Garbarek and organist Kjell Johnsen recorded in 1979 and released on the ECM label in 1980.

Reception 
The Allmusic review awarded the album 2 stars.

Track listing 
All compositions by Jan Garbarek and Kjell Johnsen
 " Aftenland" - 7:14   
 "Syn" - 6:42   
 "Linje" - 1:58   
 "Bue" - 2:04   
 "Enigma" - 3:39   
 "Kilden" - 7:33   
 "Spill" - 4:21   
 "Iskirken" - 6:48   
 "Tegn" - 4:54  
Recorded at Engelbrekt Church in Stockholm, Sweden in December 1979

Personnel
Jan Garbarek - soprano saxophone, tenor saxophone, wood flute
Kjell Johnsen - pipe organ

References

ECM Records albums
Jan Garbarek albums
1980 albums
Albums produced by Manfred Eicher